The Hispaniolan Ornithological Society, is a non-profit environmental organization dedicated to nature conservation, particularly of birds and their habitats, on the island of Hispaniola (Haiti and the Dominican Republic). SOH's mission is to "conserve Hispaniolan birds and their habitats through research, community education, and professional training".

Established in the Dominican Republic in 2001 and incorporated by presidential decree #85504, the SOH was founded by a group of bird watchers and biologists committed with the conservation of birds and their natural environments.

Education programs include promoting bird watching as well as giving presentations on local birds in public schools, private schools, and in rural communities. SOH has also been involved in publishing several books on birds of the Hispaniola, the latest one being "The Birds of the Dominican Republic and Haiti", by Dr. Steven Latta, et al.

SOH has strong relationships with other conservation organizations, with which it has partnered in important projects. These partners include the U.S. National Aviary, The Peregrine Fund, and the Audubon Society of Haiti. Field work conducted in collaboration with these entities includes studies of the critically endangered Ridgway's hawk (Buteo ridgwayi), nest cavity restoration for the Hispaniolan parrot (Amazona ventralis), and wintering ecology of the Bicknell's thrush (Catharus bicknelli).

Interesting facts

 SOH is the local administrator of Cornell University's and National Audubon Society's eBird project.
 Through some of its members, SOH has the most complete database of bird and nature images on the island, which are used extensively as visual aides for nature and conservancy public awareness.
 It is the Dominican institution with the most members who are fully trained to perform professional studies of avifauna. The group has several year's experience collaborating and assisting in multiple research and bird monitoring projects, most of them conducted by ornithologists from the United States.

Publications

 Aves Comunes de la República Dominicana by Steve Latta y La Sociedad Ornitológica de la Hispaniola (Spanish)

External links
 Sociedad Ornitológica de la Hispaniola webpage

Ornithological organizations
Environment of the Dominican Republic
Environment of Haiti
Animal welfare organizations based in the Dominican Republic